Canadian singer and songwriter Alessia Cara has won 20 awards out of 73 nominations. Cara signed a record deal with EP Entertainment and Def Jam Recordings in 2014, and released her debut single "Here" the following year, which earned her six nominations at the 2016 iHeartRadio MMVAs and a nomination for Single of the Year at the Juno Awards. In 2017, she released "Stay" alongside Russian-German producer Zedd, which won for Best Dance Video at the 2017 MTV Video Music Awards, and received a nomination for Top Dance/Electronic Song at the 2018 Billboard Music Awards. That same year, she released "1-800-273-8255" in collaboration with American rapper Logic and singer Khalid, which received nominations for Best Collaboration and Best Video with a Social Message at the 2018 MTV Video Music Awards and won for Best Video at the 2018 iHeartRadio MMVAs. Awarded 1 iHeartRadio Music Awards along with the accomplishment of reaching 1 Billion Total Audience Spins for “Stay” ft Zedd.

At the 60th Annual Grammy Awards, "1-800-273-8255" received nominations for Song of the Year and Best Music Video, "Stay" was nominated for Best Pop Duo/Group Performance, and Cara won for Best New Artist. In 2018, the "Growing Pains" music video earned nominations for Fan Fave Video and Best Cinematography at the 2018 iHeartRadio MMVAs and 2018 MTV Video Music Awards respectively.

Alessia Cara was set to host the 49th Annual Juno Awards, but the event was cancelled due to the coronavirus pandemic. She was the most nominated artist of that year, leading with six nominations. She won Album of The Year, Songwriter of The Year and Pop Album of The Year.

Awards and nominations

References

External links
 List of awards and nominations at the Internet Movie Database

Awards
Cara, Alessia